Tetracha martii, common name Marti's metallic tiger beetle, is a species of beetles of the family Carabidae.

Description
Adults are nocturnal and ground-dwelling.

Distribution
This species occurs in Bolivia, Brazil, Peru and Paraguay.

References
 Carabidae
 Biolib
 Canopy

External links
 Carabidae

Cicindelidae
Beetles of South America
Beetles described in 1830
Taxa named by Maximilian Perty